The Garden River is a river in the Algoma District of Ontario, Canada. The rivers source is Saymo lake and Ranger lake(Algoma District) from which it empties into the St. Marys River east of Sault Ste. Marie, Ontario.

The river gets its name from vegetable gardens kept by the Ojibwa people in this area. The Garden River First Nation Reserve is located in this area.

See also
List of Ontario rivers

Rivers of Algoma District